Alpharetta High School is a public high school located in Alpharetta, Georgia, United States within the Fulton County School System. Atlanta Magazine named Alpharetta High School one of the metro Atlanta area's best all-around high schools. In 2020, the U.S. News & World Report ranked the school #7 in Georgia and #281 nationally.

History

The school was opened in 2004 to educate students in grades 9 to 12. The school was opened due to the growing number of students in Chattahoochee High School. The 330,000 square foot school was designed by Perkins and Will with sustainable design in mind. It was relieved by the 2012 opening of Cambridge High School.

Alpharetta cluster
Alpharetta High is part of a cluster of schools in Fulton County that interact closely and educate students from kindergarten through 12th grade. 
 Creek View Elementary School
 Lake Windward Elementary
 Manning Oaks Elementary School
 Ocee Elementary School
 New Prospect Elementary School
 Webb Bridge Middle School
 Hopewell Middle School

Layout 
Most of the campus at Alpharetta High School is occupied by a main building that contains three floors and three hallways (identified as the 2000, 3000, and 4000 hallways). The bottom (first) floor contains the cafeteria, media center, and access to the buses and portables outside. The second and third floor are mostly classes, and the second floor has access to the auditorium, gym, and orchestra room. Other parts of the school outside the main building include the band building, the soccer field, football fields, tennis court, trail, and softball field.

Athletics
Competitive sports at Alpharetta High School are football, basketball, baseball, lacrosse, soccer, wrestling, tennis, track and field, cross country, volleyball, swimming, diving, cheerleading, and golf. Although not officially recognized by the Georgia High School Association, additional athletic activities include rugby, fencing, chess, cricket, and ping pong.

Fine arts

Band 
The Alpharetta High School Band Program has grown from 28 original members to over 200 members and warrants its own 10,000 SF building. The program includes three concert ensembles: Symphonic Band II, Symphonic Band I, and Wind Ensemble. AHS Band members have consistently earned multiple seats in the GA All State Band, university honor bands, and district and county honor bands. Many graduates continue to play in colleges across the country, and several AHS Band Program graduates are now band directors. The advanced Wind Ensemble has performed all over the country, from California to New York. It has been invited to perform at Music for All, Disney's Festival of Gold, several university band clinics (including Alabama, UGA, and GSU), The GMEA state convention, and the National Concert Band Festival at Carnegie Hall in NYC. The program also includes an award-winning competitive marching band, competitive indoor percussion ensemble, and an extensive nationally competitive indoor color guard program. Many graduates of the marching band program go on to perform with DCI and university bands.

Orchestra 
The Alpharetta High School Orchestra is split into five ensembles: Concert, Philharmonia, Sinfonia, Symphony, and Chamber (in ascending order of skill level). The orchestra's Symphony ensemble frequently collaborate with the band in order to perform and compete as a full symphony orchestra.

Chorus 
The Alpharetta High School Chorus performs in several concerts and is divided into smaller ensembles and clubs.

Music Technology 
In 2018 Alpharetta High School opened a new, state-of-the-art 24-seat Music Technology Lab. It is a one-of-a-kind Lab in Fulton County that gives each individual student a custom-built personal audio engineering space.  The lab is all connected through Korg's GEC5 audio communication system and Apple Remote Desktop.  The focus of the two-year program is audio production, using the full, professional version of Pro Tools as the foundation.  The goal of the AHS Music Tech Program is to create a foundation and pathway for students to become audio mix engineers and producers.

Extracurriculars 
Alpharetta High School has many extracurricular activities and about 95 clubs. Most of these clubs occur either before or after school. Many occur during Anchor Time, a 30-minute period that takes place every day. Notable clubs include Future Business Leaders of America (FBLA), Raider Ambassadors, National Honors Society, Science Olympiad, and Beta. Students may also form their own clubs.

International Baccalaureate 
In the 2018-2019 school year, Alpharetta High School was chosen to become an International Baccalaureate (IB) school. Although the school already offers Advanced Placement (AP) courses and Dual Enrollment courses at various colleges, the IB courses are completely new. Students will be allowed to complete the IB Diploma Programme by taking the required classes, or they may take specific IB classes along with other classes.

Awards

Academic 
 The school was the recipient of the 2007-2008 Governors Cup for the AAAAA school with the highest increase in SAT scores.
 Alpharetta High School was nationally ranked in Newsweeks "Best High Schools 2012," coming in at 268.
The school has been consistently at the top of the US News report, and was ranked #4 for the best Georgia high schools in 2020.

Athletic 
 The 2018 boys' varsity baseball team made the Final 4 in the State playoffs.
 The 2008 girls' cross country team were Region 6-AAAAA Champions and placed 6th in the state.
 The 2007 girls' track and field team was Region 6-AAAAA Champions and placed seventh in the state.
 The 2009 competition cheerleaders were Region 6-AAAAA Champions and placed seventh in the state.
 The 2009-10 boys' ice hockey team won the state championship (AA).
 The 2010 boys' tennis team won the school's first state championship (AAAAA).
 The 2010 competition cheerleaders won the state championship (AAAAA).
 The 2011-12 boys' ice hockey team won the state championship (AA).
 The 2012 boys' tennis team won the state championship (AAAAA).

Chess 
On March 27, 2010, the Alpharetta High School Chess Team won the State Championships by defeating Creekview 5-0, Dunwoody 5-0, Greater Atlanta Christian School 5-0, Pace Academy 5-0, and Northview 5-0. This makes them the first chess team in Georgia history to win a state championship with a perfect 25-0.

FBLA 
The school's FBLA team is one of the largest in Georgia. Many members compete at the regional, state, and national levels. For 10 years in a row, Alpharetta has won the State Sweepstakes Award for the most number of competitive wins.

Quizbowl 
 The Academic Team won the 2007–2008 Annual High Q competition, which airs on WSB-TV. They were originally alternates for the competition.
 In the 2013-2014 season, the varsity quizbowl team won the ATTACK III and GATA Winter Tournaments. The Junior varsity team won the GATA State tournament. Both the varsity and junior varsity teams won the MLK Day History Bowl Regional. The team was ranked 84th in the national quizbowl rankings at the end of the season.
 In the 2014-2015 season, the varsity quizbowl team finished third at the 25th Annual Walton Academic Challenge and won both the History Bowl and Bee Regional at Athens.

Speech and debate team 
 The school's varsity speech and debate team placed second in the State Championship in the spring of 2009.
 The school's varsity speech and debate team placed fifth at the All-State competition in 2009.

Arts 
The school's symphony orchestra, composed of nearly 90 select band and orchestra students, was chosen to perform at Chicago's 2012 and 2018 Midwest Clinic. Of thousands of schools that auditioned all over the world, The 2012 Alpharetta Symphony Orchestra was the only high school full symphony chosen that year, and included the first wind section from Fulton County Schools to ever be invited to perform at Midwest Clinic.

Notable alumni

Auzoyah Alufohai ('14) football player, Kennesaw State University (2014–2018), University of West Georgia (2019), and current NFL free agent
Michael Bennett ('09), football player, University of Georgia and Cincinnati Bengals 2015
Devontae Cacok ('15), basketball player, University of North Carolina Wilmington (2015–2019) and San Antonio Spurs (2021–present)
Joshua Dobbs ('13), football player, University of Tennessee (2013–2016) and Cleveland Browns (2022–present)
Jaycee Horn ('18), football player, University of South Carolina (2018–2020) and Carolina Panthers (2021–present)
Ariana Savalas ('05), performer

References

External links
Fulton County School System website
Alpharetta High School website

Fulton County School System high schools
2004 establishments in Georgia (U.S. state)
Educational institutions established in 2004